{{DISPLAYTITLE:C27H32N6}}
The molecular formula C27H32N6 (molar mass: 440.58 g/mol, exact mass: 440.2688 u) may refer to:

 AEE788
 Propidium monoazide (PMA)